Abel Nathaniel Bankole Stronge is a Sierra Leonean politician who was Speaker of the Parliament of Sierra Leone from 2007 through November 2013. He is a member of the ruling All People's Congress (APC) and represents the Western Area Urban District. Bankole Stronge succeeded Edmund Cowan of the Sierra Leone People's Party as speaker of Parliament after the 2007 Sierra Leone Presidential and Legislative elections.
 
Bankole Stronge was born in Freetown. He is a Christian and a member of the Creole ethnic minority who mostly live in the Western Area of Sierra Leone.

References

External links 
 https://web.archive.org/web/20090707014728/http://www.sl-parliament.org/composition.htm
 http://allafrica.com/stories/200907300505.html

Year of birth missing (living people)
Living people
Speakers of the Parliament of Sierra Leone
People from Freetown
All People's Congress politicians
Sierra Leone Creole people
Fourah Bay College alumni
21st-century Sierra Leonean lawyers